State General Bureau of Tourist Guidance (formerly State General Bureau of Tourism) is a North Korean state agency that organizes tourism in North Korea. Foreign tour operators have to work closely with the bureau; its staff accompanies all tours of foreigners.

The bureau was founded on 15 May 1986. It was renamed State General Bureau of Tourist Guidance in January 1990. It is based in the Central District of Pyongyang. Its president is Ryo Sung-chol. State General Bureau of Tourist Guidance has been a member of the World Tourism Organization since September 1987 and the Pacific Asia Travel Association since April 1995.

By and large, the North Korean tourism industry is overseen by Room 39, the organization in charge of North Korea's slush funds. Room 39 guides the State General Bureau of Tourism, which in turn "manages the earnings and maintains surveillance over the tourists, ensuring they are contained within specifically designated areas."

See also
Government of North Korea
North Korea's illicit activities

References

External links
 
 North Korea's tourism agency is online at North Korea Tech

Tourism in North Korea
Government agencies of North Korea
Tourism agencies
1986 establishments in North Korea
Government agencies established in 1986